Tom Behan (22 June 1957, in London – 30 August 2010, in Monza) was born from Irish parents.
He was an academic and writer on Italian history, politics and culture.

Behan was an active member of the British Socialist Workers Party for over 30 years.
In his youth he knew the unfair widespread prejudice against the Irish and he found reading Socialist Worker newspaper what was the only thing he thought that made sense on Ireland.
He didn't go to university until 1982, so was part of the first post-war youth generation to experience a society of mass youth unemployment.
He had lived in Naples in the early 1980s, acquiring an excellent mastery of Italian and noticing the after-earthquake management by the camorristic groups.

By the early 1990s, when he was at the University of Reading (UK), he had collected considerable documentation on organized crime and provided advice to English TV inquiry programs “Channel 4”.
After obtaining his doctorate in “Italian studies” and working for about two years in Australia, at La Trobe University of Melbourne, Behan published his first book on the subject (The Camorra, Routledge, London, 1996).
He continued to alternate his academic work, first at the University of Glasgow and then in Kent, with an intense participation in global protest events.

He was a Senior Lecturer in Italian at the University of Kent at Canterbury.

Author of the first political biography of Europe's leading radical playwright and winner of the 1997 Nobel Prize for Literature Dario Fo and an authority on Italian organised crime.

Behan died in Monza (Milan) on 30 August 2010 after a long illness and is survived by his partner, Barbara Rampoldi.

Selected bibliography

Workers' Playtime: Dario Fo Socialist Review, issue 214 (1997)

Interview: the return of Italian Communism? International Socialism Journal, issue 84 (1999)

Genoa: Nothing can be the same again International Socialism Journal, issue 92 (2001)

 (review at Socialist Worker)
The legacy of Giuseppe Garibaldi - the 19th century's Che Guevara Socialist Worker (2007)
Giovanni Pesce: leading Italian partisan, who kept fighting for freedom Socialist Worker (2007)
 (narrates the political and human story of Peppino Impastato)
How capitalism created the mafia Socialist Worker (2008)
Aldo Moro killing: a miscalculation that almost destroyed the Italian left Socialist Worker (2008)
 (It was workers who defeated Mussolini by Alexis Vassiley)

References

External links
Staff page at the University of Kent
Tom Behan in his own words (Tom Behan told Chris Bambery about his life) in Socialist Worker
Tom Behan: The Story of a Man who stood up for the Masses by Carmen Casaliggi in Socialist Worker
Tribute to Tom Behan: revolutionary activist and writer by Diane Fieldes and Tom Bramble in Socialist Alternative Magazine

British Marxists
Socialist Workers Party (UK) members
2010 deaths
1957 births
Historians of Italy
British historians
Academics of the University of Kent
British male writers